Progressivism is a broad political movement.

Progressivism may also refer to:

 Progressive Party (disambiguation), multiple political organizations
 Progressive education, belief that education must be based on the principle that humans are social animals who learn best in real-life activities
 Progressive tax, increases as the taxable base amount increases
 Progressive Era, a period of reform in the United States that flourished from the 1890s to the 1920s

See also
 Progressive (disambiguation)
 Progress (disambiguation)